Mohammad Beg (died 1672), was a Muslim of Armenian origin, who served as the Grand Vizier of the Safavid king (shah) Abbas II (r. 1642–1666) from 1654 to 1661.

Origins 
Mohammad Beg was born in Tabriz to an Armenian family, which originally served as a ghulām ("military slave") of the Safavid dynasty of Iran, but later became tailors. Mohammad Beg's father was Husayn Beg Tabrizi, who served as the court master tailor (qaychachi-bashi) during the reign of Shah Safi (r. 1629–1642).

Biography 
Mohammad Beg is first mentioned in 1643, when he was appointed as the city prefect of New Julfa, a quarter in the Safavid capital of Isfahan, which was populated by Armenians. During this period, Mohammad Beg was supported by another officer of Armenian origin named Allahverdi Khan (not be confused with the powerful military officer Allahverdi Khan, who was of Georgian origin).

In 1646, Mohammad Beg was appointed as the port-master/harbourmaster (shahbandar) of Bandar Abbas. Two years later, he  was appointed as the "controller of assay" (mu'ayyir al-mamalik). With the help of Allahverdi Khan, Mohammad Beg became the steward of the royal household (nazer-e boyutat) in 1651, thus succeeding Mohammad Ali Beg. One year later, Mohammad Beg was appointed as the governor of Kohgiluyeh. However, during the same year, Mohammad Beg's relations with Allahverdi Khan became bad, and the two became rivals. In 1654, Mohammad Beg was appointed by shah Abbas II as his grand vizier. One of his first acts was dismissing the Georgian prefect of Isfahan, Parsadan Gorgijanidze, due to his unpopularity among the inhabitants of the city. Mohammad Beg also had the empire more centralized by converting more land into the crown domain (Hamadan in 1654, Ardabil in 1656/7, Semnan in 1656/7 and Kerman in 1658).

In 1661, Mohammad Beg, after having failed to diminish the power of his rivals, was forced to resign from the grand vizier office. He was then exiled to Qom. In 1672, shah Suleiman I (r. 1666–1694) offered Mohammad Beg to become grand vizier once again, which he agreed to, but while on his way to Isfahan, he died. According to the French traveler Jean Chardin, Mohammad Beg had been poisoned by Suleiman's grand vizier Shaykh Ali Khan Zangana.

Family 
Mohammad Beg had a son named Amin Beg, who would later serve as the mu'ayyir al-mamalik in Isfahan. Mohammad Beg's two brothers,  Ughan Beg and Husayn Beg, both served as the shahbandar of Bandar Abbas. Their uncle, Shamshir Beg, also served in the office, and was succeeded by Mohammad Beg's cousin Isa Khan Beg. When Mohammad Beg was appointed as the nazer-e boyutat in 1651, he gave his previous office, mu'ayyir al-mamalik, to one of his other brother, Hasan Beg. Furthermore, when Mohammad Beg was appointed grand vizier, he appointed Hasan Beg as the qaychachi-bashi.

Furthermore, one of Mohammad Beg's nephews served as the vizier of the governor of Gilan. During most of the reign of Abbas II, all of silver and silk commerce was controlled by the family of Mohammad Beg.

References

Sources 

 
 
 
 
 
 
 
 

Grand viziers of the Safavid Empire
Safavid prefects of New Julfa
People from Tabriz
Persian Armenians
Ethnic Armenian Shia Muslims
17th-century births
1672 deaths
17th-century people of Safavid Iran